Night Ride Home is a 1999 American drama television film directed by Glenn Jordan and written by Ronald Parker and Darrah Cloud, based on the 1997 novel of the same name by Barbara Esstman. It stars Rebecca De Mornay, Keith Carradine, Ellen Burstyn, and Thora Birch. Its plot follows a family coping with the death of their son, which his sister inadvertently caused. It aired on CBS on February 7, 1999, as an episode of the Hallmark Hall of Fame anthology series.

Cast

Production
Filming took place in Portland, Oregon.

Critical response
David Kronke of Variety praised the film as a "handsome, intelligent and well-burnished production," and a "thoughtful and sensitive examination of how a family copes with grief." Terry Kelleher of People compared the film negatively against the 1980 film Ordinary People. Don Heckman of the Los Angeles Times criticized the film's screenplay, noting "the presentation of these issues is far too calculated, and their solutions far too quickly accomplished. The script’s simplistic method of resolving what in real life would be significant emotional trauma is to provide a cathartic scene that almost immediately prompts a change in characters." Ron Wertheimer of The New York Times praised the film, writing that "Night Ride Home has the courage to depict imperfect people who are walloped by a heartbreaking loss and emerge only slightly wiser and no more perfect than before. The centerpiece of the film... is the quietly disturbing performance of Rebecca De Mornay."

References

External links

1999 television films
1999 films
1999 drama films
1990s American films
1990s English-language films
American drama television films
CBS network films
Films about horses
Films based on American novels
Films directed by Glenn Jordan
Films scored by Bruce Broughton
Films set on farms
Films shot in Portland, Oregon
Hallmark Hall of Fame episodes
Television films based on books